Abhishek Vinod is an Indian actor who has appeared in Tamil and Malayalam language films. After working as a model, he made his breakthrough as an actor in Veruli as a police inspector which has directed by Amudhavanan P and with a supporting role in Jeethu Joseph's Papanasam (2015). He later moved on to play leading roles, and appear in other high-profile Tamil films such as Sketch (2018).

Career
Born in Chennai, Abhishek finished schooling at Kola Saraswathi Vaishnav Senior Secondary School and then completed his Bachelor of Business Administration from Madras University, before beginning a career in modelling during 2004. Abhishek worked in advertisements and the modelling circuit in Chennai and first acted in Malayalam film Casanovva with Mohanlal. He later portrayed the badboy senior role in Inidhu Inidhu in 2010. Abhishek portrayed a significant supporting role in the Kamal Haasan-starrer Papanasam (2015), portraying the younger brother of the character played by Gautami. The film garnered critical acclaim for the actor upon release, and remains his highest profile release. He was offered the role by his mentor Suresh Kannan, who had worked on the film as a co-director to Jeethu Joseph. He then appeared in the lead role in Veruli (2017), 
which was his masterpiece, which had a low-profile release and went unnoticed at the box office.

In early 2018, he appeared in Vijay Chandar's Sketch as a police officer alongside Vikram, and in Mannar Vagaiyara, as a part of a large family. He will also be seen in Aan Devathai (2018) in a negative role as the head of an IT company, enrolled his mass acting with the project featuring him alongside Samuthirakani, Ramya Pandian and Suja Varunee.

Personal life
Abhishek Vinod is married to Chennai-based designer Jules Idi Amin and has a son Ayaan.

Filmography

References 

Tamil Cinema News - Abhishek

External links 

Indian male film actors
Male actors in Tamil cinema
Living people
21st-century Indian male actors
People from Tamil Nadu
Tamil male actors
Year of birth missing (living people)